Lalejin (also Romanized as Lālejīn and Lālajīn; known locally as Lalin (Azerbaijani: لَلين and Ləlin means Clay), also Romanized as Lalīn; and also known as Shahr-e Lālejīn) is a city and capital of Lalejin District, in Bahar County, Hamadan Province, Iran. At the 2006 census, its population was 14,689 with 3,760 families.The population is mainly Azerbaijani Turks.

Lalejin is situated 20 kilometres north of Hamadan at an altitude of 1731 meters.

Lalejin District has an area of 508 square kilometers and a population of 44,568. It is situated in the East of Bahar and is bordered in the west by Hamadan and in north by Kabudrahang and contains Mohajeran and Sofalgaran.

Sister cities

References

External links

Lalejin, the heartland of pottery and ceramics in Iran
The leading ceramic centers of Iran

Populated places in Bahar County

Cities in Hamadan Province